Sonja Lyubomirsky (born December 14, 1966) is a Russian-born American professor in the Department of Psychology at the University of California, Riverside and author of The How of Happiness: A Scientific Approach to Getting the Life You Want.

Education 
Lyubomirsky received her B.A. from Harvard University and her Ph.D. in Social/Personality Psychology from Stanford University.

Awards 
Lyubomirsky has received a John Templeton Foundation grant, a Science of Generosity grant, a Templeton Positive Psychology Prize, and a million-dollar grant (with Ken Sheldon) from the National Institute of Mental Health. In 2021, she received an honorary doctorate from the University of Basel.

The How of Happiness 

The How of Happiness was published in 2008 by Penguin Press. The book has been translated into 22 languages.

The premise of The How of Happiness is that 50 percent of a given human's long-term happiness level is genetically determined, 10 percent is affected by life circumstances and situation, and a remaining 40 percent of happiness is subject to self control.

The How of Happiness led to an iPhone application called Live Happy, produced by Signal Patterns. Lyubomirsky is on the company's scientific advisory board.

The How of Happiness has also led to a song, The How of Happiness Book Tune, a mnemonic to remember the content within the book.

The Myths of Happiness 
The Myths of Happiness, published by Penguin Press, claims why major life events that should make a person happy don't, and that what shouldn't make us happy often does.

References

External links 

 Lyubomirsky's webpage about The How of Happiness
 20/20 video segment covering Lyubomirsky and The How of Happiness
 Video of Good Morning America interview with Lyubomirsky about The How of Happiness

Living people
1966 births
University of California, Riverside faculty
Positive psychologists
21st-century American women writers
21st-century American psychologists
Harvard University alumni
Stanford University alumni
Academic journal editors
20th-century American psychologists